Thelma Barina-Rojas is a Filipino volleyball player. She played for the Philippines women's national volleyball team at the Southeast Asian Games from 1981 to 1993, helping the team medal in all six editions she participated in.

Career
Barina-Rojas took up the sport of volleyball when she was pursuing a college course on accounting at the Southwestern University in Cebu City. She was part of the Philippines women's national volleyball team that won the gold medal at the 1981, 1985, 1987 and 1993 Southeast Asian Games. She was named Most Valuable Player and Best Open Spiker in the 1987 edition, and the Best Service Receiver in the 1991 edition.

Post-retirement
By 2017, Barina-Rojas is working at the Makati Gospel School where she serves as a PE teacher and the head coach of the school's volleyball team.

Personal life
Barina is married to volleyball referee Rodrigo "Buboy" Rojas with whom she has three children.

References

1960s births
Living people
Sportspeople from Cebu City
Philippines women's international volleyball players
Filipino women's volleyball players
Southeast Asian Games medalists in volleyball
Southeast Asian Games gold medalists for the Philippines
Southeast Asian Games silver medalists for the Philippines
Competitors at the 1981 Southeast Asian Games
Competitors at the 1985 Southeast Asian Games
Competitors at the 1987 Southeast Asian Games
Competitors at the 1991 Southeast Asian Games
Competitors at the 1993 Southeast Asian Games
20th-century Filipino women